The Woodrow Wilson Bridge in Jackson, Mississippi, is an open-spandrel concrete arch bridge over the Pearl River. It was built in 1925. It was designated a Mississippi Landmark in 1987 and listed on the National Register of Historic Places in 1988.
It has been demolished and replaced, but a section has been kept and placed as a memorial at an overlook of the Pearl River.

References

Road bridges on the National Register of Historic Places in Mississippi
Bridges completed in 1925
Mississippi Landmarks
National Register of Historic Places in Jackson, Mississippi
Concrete bridges in the United States
Open-spandrel deck arch bridges in the United States
1925 establishments in Mississippi
Pearl River (Mississippi–Louisiana)